Thomas Bachem (born November 14, 1985) is a German entrepreneur, software developer and investor. He is founder and chancellor of the CODE University of Applied Sciences in Berlin.

Career 

Bachem grew up in Cologne and taught himself computer programming at the age of 12 years. As a teenager, he ran an online portal for software development and developed websites for corporate customers.

Parallel to his studies at Cologne Business School, he developed the video-sharing website sevenload in 2005, which acquired more than €25 million in venture capital while he was still a student and was sold to Hubert Burda Media in 2010. Immediately thereafter he founded United Prototype, which developed the social game Fliplife and was acquired in 2012 by German-Turkish gaming company Kaisergames. In his spare time, Bachem developed Lebenslauf.com (engl. Resume.com), an online CV editor which he sold to publicly traded XING AG in 2014.

In 2016, Bachem founded the CODE University of Applied Sciences in Berlin in an effort to improve the education of software developers since existing computer science courses appeared outdated and too theoretical to him. The accredited private university was granted state recognition by the state of Berlin in July 2017 and commenced its English-language studies in October 2017. Bachem is the youngest university chancellor in Germany.

In addition to its own entrepreneurial activities Bachem supports young startup companies as an angel investor.

Voluntary Commitment 

In 2012, Bachem, together with other internet entrepreneurs, founded the German Startups Association as a political voice for startups in Germany. He serves as its Vice Chairman ever since.

Bachem also initiated the non-profit Code+Design Initiative and is a senator of the German Academy of Science and Engineering. He is a long-time member of the Entrepreneurs' Organization and for many years served as a regional board chair.

Awards 

Germany's leading business newspaper Handelsblatt named Bachem "Founder of the Year 2017". German magazine Capital honored him in the same year as "Young Elite - Top 40 under 40" in the Society and Science category. In December 2017, the magazine Business Punk named him one of "100 Rising Stars" in its "Watchlist 2018". In August 2019, he received the "Innovators Under 35" award of the German issue of MIT Technology Review and was named "Social Innovator of the Year".

Previously, Bachem was already named as a "famous German founder" in 2010 by business magazine WirtschaftsWoche and in 2014 as one of 25 "notorious founders - Germany's pioneers."

In 2019, the university he founded was awarded the "German Excellence Prize" as well as honored as an "Excellent Place" in the annual "Land of Ideas" competition.

References

External links 
 Thomas Bachem's Personal Website

1985 births
Living people
Businesspeople from Cologne
German computer programmers
German company founders
21st-century German businesspeople